The concept of magic numbers in the field of chemistry refers to a specific property (such as stability) for only certain representatives among a distribution of structures. It was first recognized by inspecting the intensity of mass-spectrometric signals of rare gas cluster ions.

In case a gas condenses into clusters of atoms, the number of atoms in these clusters that are most likely to form varies between a few and hundreds. However, there are peaks at specific cluster sizes, deviating from a pure statistical distribution. Therefore, it was concluded that clusters of these specific numbers of rare gas atoms dominate due to their exceptional stability. The concept was also successfully applied to explain the monodispersed occurrence of  thiolate-protected gold clusters; here the outstanding stability of specific cluster sizes is connected with their respective electronic configuration.  

The term magic numbers is also used in the field of nuclear physics. In this context, magic numbers refer to a specific number of protons or neutrons that forms complete nucleon shells.

See also
Magic number (physics)

References

Gas laws